"Ser o Parecer" (English: "To Be or to Seem") is a song by Mexican Latin pop group RBD from their third studio album Celestial (2006). The group also recorded a Portuguese version of the song for Celestial (Versão Brasil) (2006). It was released on September 18, 2006, as the album's lead single. The Portuguese version was released two days later.

Background and composition
"Ser o Parecer" was written and produced by Armando Ávila. The song narrate a classic story of unrequited love, it tells of a girl who has fallen for a guy who never pays any attention to her. The lyrics of the song describe the girl's unsuccessful attempts to catch the guy's attention and "despertar el interés vacío", or "awaken the empty interest".

Chart performance
In the United States, "Ser o Parecer" debuted and peaked at position number 84 on the Billboard Hot 100 on the week ending December 16, 2006. On the Hot Latin Songs chart, "Ser o Parecer" entered at number five on the week ending October 28, 2006. In its six-week on the chart, the single climbed to the top position of the chart on the week ending December 2, 2006, topping the chart for two consecutive weeks. "Ser o Parecer" stayed within the top-ten positions of the chart for fifteen consecutive weeks, from October 2006 to February 2007.

Music video 
EMI announced on October 2, 2006, that the accompanying music video for "Ser o Parecer" was finished. EMI Televisa Music officially released the video on YouTube. It was directed by Esteban Madrazo and filmed in São Paulo, Brazil while the group was touring the country.

The video features all of the members of the group in trashy, post-grunge attire. The video illustrates how the members changed from virtual unknowns to international superstars. In addition, it features CGI monster-like creatures on the streets along with the group.

Awards and nominations

Charts

Weekly charts

Notes

2006 singles
RBD songs
Spanish-language songs
Songs written by Armando Ávila
Articles containing video clips
Song recordings produced by Armando Ávila